Neilburg Airport  is located  south-west of Neilburg, Saskatchewan, Canada.

The airport is normally unmanned and contains two sheds to store planes.

See also 
 List of airports in Saskatchewan

References 

Registered aerodromes in Saskatchewan
Manitou Lake No. 442, Saskatchewan